The Farmington Mine disaster was an explosion that happened at approximately 5:30 a.m. on November 20, 1968, at the Consol No. 9 coal mine north of Farmington and Mannington, West Virginia, United States.

At the time, 99 miners were inside. Over the course of the next few hours, 21 miners were able to escape the mine, but 78 were still trapped. All who were unable to escape perished; the bodies of 19 of the dead were never recovered. The cause of the explosion was never determined, but the accident served as the catalyst for several new laws that were passed to protect miners.

The Farmington No. 9 Mine Memorial, bearing the names of the men who died, is located at the entrance of Flat Run Road in Mannington, WV.

Consol No. 9

This mine was originally opened in 1909 as the Jamison No. 9 Mine, operated by the Jamison Coal and Coke Company. Even in 1909, it was noted that "gasses are liberating" from the coal in the mine, so that locked safety lamps were used at all times. Initially, compressed air power was used to undercut the coal, which was then blasted before horse power was used to haul the coal to the shaft, but within a year, compressed air locomotives were obtained for the mine railway.

On November 14, 1954, an explosion ripped through the mine, killing 16 miners and leading to a temporary shutdown.  In addition to 16 deaths, the explosion destroyed the headframe of one mine shaft. The explosion occurred during pillar removal conducted as part of retreat mining.

Under Consolidation Coal Company ownership, coal production in 1977 was 98772 tons.  This coal was produced as a byproduct of the recovery operation after the 1968 explosion.

Chronology

At 5:30 a.m on November 20, 1968, an explosion shook the mine. Miners living in the area heard the noise and, knowing what it meant, headed to the mine, where they discovered a rapidly spreading fire with flames shooting  into the air. Within hours, 21 miners made it to the surface but 78 were still trapped underground.

The fires continued to burn for over a week, and on November 29, rescuers finally admitted defeat after air samples from drill holes showed air unable to sustain human life. The mine was sealed on November 30 with concrete to starve the fire of oxygen.

In September 1969, the mine was unsealed in an attempt to recover the miners' bodies. Progress was slow because workers discovered cave-ins that they had to tunnel around. This recovery effort continued for almost ten years. By April 1978, 59 of the 78 bodies had been recovered.

Victims
The 1968 explosion killed 79 miners.Those marked with an asterisk ( * ) indicates their body was unrecovered.

Arthur A. Anderson Jr.
Jack O. Armstrong*
Thomas D. Ashcraft
Jimmy Barr
Orval D. Beam*
John Joseph Bingamon*
Thomas Boggess
Louis S. Boros*
Harold W. Butt
Lee E. Carpenter
David V. Cartwright
William E. Currence*
Dale E. Davis
Albert R. DeBerry
George O. Decker
Howard A. Deel*
James E. Efaw
Joe Ferris
Virgil "Pete" Forte*
H. Wade Foster*
Aulda G. Freeman Jr.*
Robert L. Glover
Forrest B. Goff
John F. Gouzd
Charles F. Hardman
Ebert E. Hartzell
Simon P. Hayes
Paul F. Henderson*
Roy F Henderson Sr.
Steve Horvath
Junior M. Jenkins*
James Jones
Pete J. Kaznoski Sr.*
Robert D. Kerns
Charles E. King
James Ray Kniceley
George R. Kovar
David Mainella Sr.
Walter R. Martin
Frank Matish*
Hartsel L. Mayle
Dennis N. McDonald
Emilio D. Megna*
Jack D. Michael*
Wayne R. Minor
Charles E. Moody
Paul O. Moran
Adron W. Morris
Joseph Muto
Randall R. Parsons
Raymond R. Parsons
Nicholas Petro
Fred Burt Rogers
William D. Sheme
Robert J. Sigley
Henry J. Skarzinski
Russell D. Snyder
John Sopuch*
Jerry L. Stoneking
Harry L. Strait
Albert Takacs
William L. Takacs*
Dewey Tarley
Frank Tate Jr.
Goy A. Taylor
Hoy B. Taylor
Edwin A. Tennant*
Homer E. Tichenor
Dennis L. Toler
John W. Toothman
Gorman H. Trimble
Roscoe M. Triplett
William T. Walker
James H. Walter
Lester B. Willard
Edward A. Williams*
Lloyd William Wilson
Jerry R. Yanero
Pete Zogel Jr.

Resulting governmental legislation 

The Farmington disaster was a catalyst for the passage of major changes in U.S. mining safety law. One month after the disaster the U.S. Department of the Interior held a conference on mine safety. Stewart Udall's opening speech specifically referenced Farmington and concluded, "let me assure you, the people of this country no longer will accept the disgraceful health and safety record that has characterized this major industry."

As a result of the Farmington disaster, the United States Congress passed the 1969 Coal Mine Safety and Health Act which strengthened safety standards, increased Federal mine inspections, created the Mine Safety and Health Administration, and gave coal miners specific safety and health rights. In November 1968 Davitt McAteer conducted a study of West Virginia mines after the Farmington disaster.

Investigation 

In 1990, the federal Mine Safety and Health Administration investigation into the accident concluded in part that the ventilation in the mine “was inadequate overall, and most probably non-existent in some areas.”

In 2008, a memo written by an investigator in September 1970 came to light. In it, the inspector wrote that a safety alarm on a ventilation fan used to flush explosive methane gas from the mine had been disabled. “Therefore when the fan would stop there was no way of anyone knowing about it because the alarm signal was bypassed,” the inspector wrote.

Litigation 

Families of the miners that died in the blast were never compensated for their deaths. A lawsuit filed in Marion County Circuit Court on November 6, 2014, on behalf of the estates of dead miners, alleged that plaintiffs discovered in June that the mine's chief electrician, Alex Kovarbasich, disabled a ventilation fan that contributed to the accident. The lawsuit further alleges that the mining company, Consolidation Coal Co., has concealed the identity of the manager since the accident. After being transferred to federal district court due to diversity of plaintiffs' jurisdiction, the case was initially dismissed due to the statute of limitations around wrongful death suits in West Virginia. The suit was subsequently referred to the Supreme Court of Appeals of West Virginia by the United States Court of Appeals for the Fourth Circuit due to a lack of precedent. The court determined that the statute of repose is an essential element of a wrongful death claim, and had since passed.

References

External links

 Farmington No. 9 Mine Memorial - Location
 West Virginia Mine Disasters 1884 to Present
 West Virginia Coal Mining Disasters
 West Virginia Department of Arts, Culture & History - Farmington Mine Disaster
 Decades After Deadly W. Virginia Mine Disaster, New Lawsuit Assigns Blame

1968 mining disasters
1968 in West Virginia
Coal mining disasters in West Virginia
Marion County, West Virginia
1968 disasters in the United States
November 1968 events in the United States